For the 1978–79 West Ham United F.C. season in English football, West Ham United played in the Second Division following their relegation the previous season.

Season summary
West Ham occupied a promotion place at the end of February, but after a loss of form that saw them win just one of their last seven League matches they finished in fifth place. They were knocked out of both domestic cup competitions by lower league opposition in the first round they entered.

In February 1979, West Ham broke the world record transfer fee for a goalkeeper when they signed Phil Parkes from Queens Park Rangers for £565,000.

League table

Results

Football League Second Division

FA Cup

League Cup

Players

References

1978-79
English football clubs 1978–79 season
1978 sports events in London
1979 sports events in London